Giuseppe Staffa (1807–1877) was an Italian composer and conductor. He is best remembered for his seven operas which he composed between 1827 and 1852. He was active as a conductor in Naples at the Teatro del Fondo and Teatro Nuovo. One of his students was Enrico Bevignani.

References

1807 births
1877 deaths
Italian classical composers
Italian male classical composers
Italian conductors (music)
Italian male conductors (music)
Italian opera composers
Male opera composers
19th-century classical composers
19th-century conductors (music)
19th-century Italian composers